The 1991 All-Ireland Minor Hurling Championship was the 61st staging of the All-Ireland Minor Hurling Championship since its establishment by the Gaelic Athletic Association in 1928. The championship began on 16 April 1991 and ended on 1 September 1991.

Kilkenny entered the championship as the defending champions.

On 1 September 1991, Kilkenny won the championship following a 0-15 to 1-10 defeat of Tipperary in the All-Ireland final. This was their second All-Ireland title in-a-row and their 14th title overall.

Kilkenny's P. J. Delaney was the championship's top scorer with 2-29.

Results

Leinster Senior Hurling Championship

First round

Semi-finals

Final

Munster Senior Hurling Championship

First round

Semi-finals

Final

Ulster Senior Hurling Championship

Semi-final

Final

All-Ireland Senior Hurling Championship

Semi-finals

Final

Championship statistics

Top scorers

Top scorers overall

External links
 All-Ireland Minor Hurling Championship: Roll Of Honour

Minor
All-Ireland Minor Hurling Championship